The 2015–16 Columbus Blue Jackets season was the 16th season for the National Hockey League franchise that was established on June 25, 1997. Columbus hired head coach John Tortorella following the firing of Todd Richards, who started the season 0–8–0. The team began its regular season games on October 9, 2015 against the New York Rangers.

Regular season 
After a seven game losing streak to start the season, the Blue Jackets fired head coach Todd Richards and hired John Tortorella on October 21.

Standings

Schedule and results

Pre-season

Regular season

Player statistics 
Final stats
Skaters

Goaltenders

†Denotes player spent time with another team before joining the Blue Jackets. Statistics reflect time with the Blue Jackets only.
‡Denotes player was traded mid-season. Statistics reflect time with the Blue Jackets only.
Bold/italics denotes franchise record.

Player suspensions/fines

Awards and honours

Awards

Milestones

Transactions 
The Blue Jackets have been involved in the following transactions during the 2015–16 season.

Trades

Free agents acquired

Free agents lost

Claimed via waivers

Lost via waivers

Player signings

Draft picks

Below are the Columbus Blue Jackets' selections at the 2015 NHL Entry Draft, to be held on June 26–27, 2015 at the BB&T Center in Sunrise, Florida.

Draft notes

 The Tampa Bay Lightning's first-round pick went to the Columbus Blue Jackets as the result of a trade on June 26, 2015 that sent Toronto's second-round pick in 2015 (34th overall) and Philadelphia's third-round pick in 2015 (68th overall) to Toronto in exchange for this pick.
Toronto previously acquired this pick as the result of a trade on June 26, 2015 that sent Nashville's first-round pick in 2015 (24th overall) to Philadelphia in exchange for Chicago's second-round pick in 2015 (61st overall) and this pick.
Philadelphia previously acquired this pick as the result of a trade on March 2, 2015 that sent Braydon Coburn to Tampa Bay in exchange for Radko Gudas, a third-round pick in 2015 and this pick (being conditional at the time of the trade). The condition – Philadelphia will receive the Lightning's first-round draft pick in 2015 if it is not the first overall selection – was converted on March 30, 2015 when Tampa Bay qualified for the 2015 Stanley Cup playoffs ensuring that this pick could not be a lottery selection.
 The Anaheim Ducks' second-round pick went to the Columbus Blue Jackets as the result of a trade on March 2, 2015 that sent James Wisniewski and Detroit's third-round pick in 2015 to Anaheim in exchange for Rene Bourque, William Karlsson and this pick.
 The Columbus Blue Jackets' fourth-round pick went to the Los Angeles Kings as the result of a trade on June 27, 2015 that sent a fourth-round pick in 2015 (104th overall) and a sixth-round pick in 2016 to Philadelphia in exchange for this pick.
Philadelphia previously acquired this pick as the result of a trade on June 23, 2014 that sent Scott Hartnell to Columbus in exchange for R.J. Umberger and this pick.
 The Minnesota Wild's fifth-round pick went to the Columbus Blue Jackets as the result of a trade on March 2, 2015 that sent Jordan Leopold to Minnesota in exchange for Justin Falk and this pick.

References

Columbus Blue Jackets seasons
Columbus Blue Jackets season, 2015-16
Blue
Blue